Thomas Hodgson  (June 5, 1924 – February 27, 2006) was a Canadian sprint canoer who competed in the 1950s, and also one of the acclaimed Canadian artists known as Painters Eleven. Competing in two Summer Olympics, he earned his best finish of eighth in the C-2 1000 m event at Helsinki in 1952.

Career
Prior to the Olympics, Hodgson served in the Royal Canadian Air Force during World War II. He started painting as a child. Hodgson began working in advertising from 1948 to 1967 but at the same time, experimented as an artist, making watercolours and joining art societies such as the Ontario Society of Artists, the Royal Canadian Academy of Arts, the Canadian Group of Painters and the Canadian Society of Painters in Water Colour.  By the early 1950s, he was experimenting with abstraction, and was invited to join Painters Eleven.

Work
His work is characterized by a large format, in bold colours and strokes of paint. One critic calls him the consummate gestural painter of the Eleven, gutsy and aggressive but finally, lyrical. He thought of abstraction as abstracting a feeling or memory of something rather than a record of nature. From 1968 to 1973, he taught at the Ontario College of Art. Afterwards, he taught at Art`s Space in Toronto.

A native of Toronto, he died in Peterborough of Alzheimer's disease on February 27, 2006.

References

Bibliography

Further reading 

1924 births
2006 deaths
Artists from Toronto
Canadian male canoeists
Royal Canadian Air Force personnel of World War II
Canoeists from Toronto
Canoeists at the 1952 Summer Olympics
Canoeists at the 1956 Summer Olympics
Neurological disease deaths in Ontario
Deaths from Alzheimer's disease
Olympic canoeists of Canada
Academic staff of OCAD University
Sportspeople from Peterborough, Ontario
20th-century Canadian painters
Canadian male painters
21st-century Canadian painters
20th-century Canadian male artists
21st-century Canadian male artists
Canadian abstract artists
Canadian collage artists